The Police and Magistrates' Courts Act 1994 (c 29) is an Act of the Parliament of the United Kingdom.

It defined the police areas, constituted the current police authorities and set out the relationship between the Home Secretary and the territorial police forces. It superseded the Police Act 1964 and was itself replaced by the Police Act 1996

See also
Police Act
Magistrates' Courts Act

References
Halsbury's Statutes,

External links
The Police and Magistrates' Courts Act 1994, as amended from the National Archives.
The Police and Magistrates' Courts Act 1994, as originally enacted from the National Archives.

United Kingdom Acts of Parliament 1994
Acts of the Parliament of the United Kingdom concerning England and Wales
Law enforcement in England and Wales
Magistrates' courts in England and Wales